Thomas or Tom Atwood may refer to:

 Thomas Warr Attwood (1733–1775), English builder and architect
Thomas Atwood (judge) (died 1793), chief justice of Dominica and the Bahamas
Thomas Atwood House, a historic property on Cape Cod, Massachusetts, USA
Tom Atwood (born 1971), American photographer, New York City

See also
Thomas Attwood (disambiguation)
Thomas Atwode (by 1469–1532), Member of Parliament for Canterbury, England